Talent Suomi ("Finnish Talent" or "Talent Finland") is the Finnish version of the Got Talent format of the program and airs on Nelonen. The idea behind the programme is to search for the most talented and promising entertainment. Talent contest took off for the first time in Finland at the end of September 2007. The programme was originally hosted by Susanna Laine and Martin Coulter and had contemporary magazine editor Katja Ståhl, television presenter and film director Timo Koivusalo, as well as the Finnish National Ballet dancer and choreographer Sami Saikkonen as judges. The prize was €30,000.

Auditions were held in three locations in Tampere, Oulu and Helsinki. Forty talents continued from the qualifiers to the semi-finals, where eight passed on to the finals which aired on 9 December. Spectators had the possibility to vote. Talent Suomi 2007 winner was 18-year-old beat boxer Aleksi Vähäpassi.

Series

Series 1 (2007)
A total of 40 semi finalists and only eight got to the finals, which was held at the House of Culture in Helsinki.

Series 2 (2009)
The finale was broadcast live on 22 November and the winner was Miikka Mäkelä, or motor skills, Miikka. Second, was ten years old singer Iina Kangasharju. And Markku Laamanen finished third. The finale was watched by over a million viewers, and broke Channel Four's new box office records.

Series 3 (2011)
The third series began airing in September 2011 and ended in November of that year. Program presenter as well as the jury remained the same. Initial Qualification was held in Helsinki, Tampere and Kuopio. The final was held in Espoo Barona Arena.

Series 4 (2012)
The fourth series began production in autumn 2012.

Series 5 (2016)
After a four-year hiatus, the fifth series returned in 2016. Heikki Paasonen and  hosted the show with Sami Hedberg, Jari Sillanpää, Sara Forsberg, and Riku Nieminen as judges. David Hasselhoff was a guest judge.

References

External links
 

Finland
Television series by Fremantle (company)
2007 Finnish television series debuts
2000s Finnish television series
Finnish television series based on British television series
Nelonen original programming
Finnish non-fiction television series